Kropáčova Vrutice is a municipality and village in Mladá Boleslav District in the Central Bohemian Region of the Czech Republic. It has about 900 inhabitants.

Administrative parts
Villages of Kojovice, Krpy, Střížovice and Sušno are administrative parts of Kropáčova Vrutice. Kojovice forms an exclave of the municipal territory.

Geography
It lies in the Jizera Table.

History
The first written mention of Vrutice is from 1385. During the rule of the Kropáč family in the 17th century, the village was renamed Kropáčova Vrutice.

Transport
Kropáčova Vrutice is located on a railway line leading from Prague to Turnov.

Sights
The main landmark is the Church of the Beheading of Saint John the Baptist in Krpy. It is a Gothic church fro mthe 14th century, which was modified in the Baroque style and then in 1900 in the Purist style.

Notable people
Miroslav Tyrš (1832–1884), sports organizer, cofounder of Sokol; grew up here
Josef Kořenský (1847–1938), traveller, educator and writer

References

External links

Villages in Mladá Boleslav District